Abbott and Costello Meet the Invisible Man is a 1951 American science fiction comedy film directed by Charles Lamont and starring the team of Abbott and Costello alongside Nancy Guild.

The film depicts the misadventures of Lou Francis and Bud Alexander, two private detectives investigating the murder of a boxing promoter. The film was part of a series in which the duo meet classic characters from Universal's stable, including Frankenstein, the Mummy and the Keystone Kops.

Plot
Lou Francis and Bud Alexander have just graduated from a private detective school. Tommy Nelson, a middleweight boxer, comes to them with their first case. Tommy recently escaped from jail after being accused of murdering his manager, and asks the duo to accompany him on a visit to his fiancée, Helen Gray. He wants her uncle, Dr. Philip Gray, to inject him with a special serum which will render Tommy invisible, and hopes to use the newfound invisibility to investigate his manager's murder and prove his innocence. Dr. Gray adamantly refuses, arguing that the serum is still unstable, recalling that the formula's discoverer, Jack Griffin, was driven insane by the formula and did not become visible again until after he was killed. However, as the police arrive Tommy injects himself with it and successfully becomes invisible. Detective Roberts questions Dr. Gray and Helen while Bud and Lou search for Tommy.

Helen and Tommy convince Bud and Lou to help them seek the real killer, after Tommy explains that the motive for the murder occurred after he refused to "throw" a fight, knocking his opponent, Rocky Hanlon, out cold. Morgan, the promoter who fixed the fight, ordered Tommy's manager beaten to death while framing Tommy for the crime. In order to investigate undercover, Lou poses as a boxer, with Bud as his manager. They go to Stillwell's gym, where Lou gets in the ring with Rocky. Tommy, still invisible, gets into the ring with them and again knocks out Hanlon, making it look like Lou did it, and an official match is arranged. Needing to prove Morgan was behind the plot to frame Tommy, Bud and Lou go out to the same restaurant to covertly spy on him alongside an invisible Tommy. But the effects of the serum and Tommy getting drunk make the task difficult for the two who have to keep covering for him. Morgan pays off Lou to throw the fight, but when the match occurs with the aid of an invisible Tommy, Hanlon is knocked out yet again after a wildly chaotic boxing match. Morgan plans Bud's murder, but is thwarted by Tommy. Bud, Lou, and Tommy fight off Morgan and his goons, but when Tommy is rendered partially visible from some steam he is wounded in the battle and begins to bleed badly. The protagonists rush to the hospital where a blood transfusion is arranged between Lou and Tommy, thanks to Lou having the same blood type. During the transfusion Tommy becomes visible again – some of Tommy's blood has apparently entered Lou, who briefly turns invisible, only to reappear with his legs inexplicably on backwards.

Cast

Production

Abbott and Costello Meet the Invisible Man was filmed between October 3 and November 6, 1950. The characters' surnames "Alexander" and "Francis" are Abbott's and Costello's real middle names.

The special effects, which depicted invisibility and other optical illusions, were created by Stanley Horsley, son of cinema pioneer David Horsley. He also did the special effects for The Invisible Man Returns, The Invisible Woman and Invisible Agent.

As a reference to the first Invisible Man film, a photo is featured of the serum's inventor, Dr. John "Jack" Griffin, which is actually a picture of Claude Rains, who played the role in Universal's first Invisible Man film in 1933.

When asked by a reporter whom he has fought in the past, Lou answers, "Chuck Lamont, Bud Grant". The film's director and screenwriter, respectively, are Charles Lamont and John Grant.

Release
The film had a preview screening at The Fox theater in St. Louis, Missouri, on March 9, 1951. The film saw release on Wednesday, March 14.

Home media
This film has been released several times on DVD. First on The Best of Abbott and Costello Volume Three, on August 3, 2004, on October 28, 2008, as part of Abbott and Costello: The Complete Universal Pictures Collection, and in 2015 in the Abbott and Costello Meet the Monsters Collection. Later, the film was included in the 3-disc The Invisible Man: The Complete Legacy Collection and the 21-disc Universal Classic Monsters: Complete 30-Film Collection, both released on September 2, 2014. It was released on Blu-ray on August 28, 2018.

Shown on the MeTV show Svengoolie on Dec 24, 2022.

Notes

References

External links

 
 
 
 
 

1951 films
Abbott and Costello films
American science fiction comedy films
American black-and-white films
American crossover films
American detective films
1950s English-language films
Films directed by Charles Lamont
Films based on The Invisible Man
American parody films
Universal Pictures films
1950s science fiction comedy films
1951 comedy films
Comedy crossover films
Horror crossover films
Science fiction crossover films
1950s American films